Richard Myddelton ( – 20 December 1796), of Chirk Castle, Denbighshire, was a Welsh politician.

Early life
Myddelton was the only son of Richard Myddelton of Chirk Castle and Elizabeth ( Rushout) Myddelton (1730–1772). His younger sister, Charlotte Myddelton, married Robert Biddulph, a banker with Cocks Biddulph. Another sister, Maria Myddelton, who married, as his second wife, Hon. Frederick West (a younger son of John West, 2nd Earl De La Warr).

His maternal grandparents were Lady Anne Compton (the sixth daughter of George Compton, 4th Earl of Northampton) and Sir John Rushout, 4th Baronet of Northwick Park, Gloucestershire. His paternal grandparents were Mary ( Liddell) Myddelton and John Myddelton, MP. His maternal grandfather was Thomas Liddell of Bedford Row, London.

Career

Myddelton was educated at Eton College, and matriculated at Christ Church, Oxford in 1781. He succeeded to his father's Welsh estates, including Chirk Castle, in 1795.

He succeeded his father, unopposed, as a Member of Parliament for Denbigh Boroughs in 1788 and, reportedly, never spoke in his first Parliament. He served until his death in 1796 and voted against Pitt on the Regency bill. Upon his death while a sitting MP, he was replaced by Thomas Tyrwhitt Jones in January 1797.

Personal life
He died unmarried on 20 December 1796. Chirk Castle and some local land was inherited by his sister Charlotte, who had married Robert Biddulph and adopted the additional surname of Myddelton. The remaining property was divided between his other two sisters.

References
Notes

Sources

1764 births
1796 deaths
Richard
Members of the Parliament of Great Britain for Denbighshire
Members of the Parliament of Great Britain for Welsh constituencies
British MPs 1784–1790
British MPs 1790–1796
British MPs 1796–1800
People educated at Eton College